When Angels Speak of Love is a music album by the American Jazz musician Sun Ra and his Myth Science Arkestra. Originally released in 1966 on Sun Ra's own Saturn label, the record would have only been available by mail order or sold at Arkestra concerts, and is one of the rarest of all Saturn releases. The record was reissued on compact disc by Evidence in 2000.

Next stop Mars
'[When Angels Speak of Love] was considered a bizarre record when it was heard even three years later, made more bizarre by extreme echo, horns straining for the shrillest notes possible, rhythms layered, their polyrhythmic effect exaggerated by massive reverberation (which was abruptly turned off and on). Next Stop Mars is the centrepiece of the album, a very long work which opens with a space chant, followed by Allen and Gilmore taking chances on their horns beyond what almost any other musician would dare at that time. Sun Ra played behind them, again relentlessly spinning around a single tonal center with two-handed independence, then rumbling thunderously at the bottom of the keyboard against Boykins's bass, a clangor made heavier by electronic enhancement.' John F Szwed

Track listing

12" Vinyl
All songs by Sun Ra
Side A:
"Celestial Fantasy" - (5.55)
"The Idea Of It All" - (7.32)
"Ecstasy of Being" - (9.53)
Side B:
"When Angels Speak of Love" - (4.34)
"Next Stop Mars" - (17.56)

Musicians 
Sun Ra - Piano, Clavioline, Gong
Walter Miller - Trumpet
Marshall Allen - Oboe, Alto Saxophone, Percussion
Danny Davis - Alto Sax
John Gilmore - Tenor Sax, Percussion
Pat Patrick - Baritone Saxophone, Percussion
Robert Cummings - Bass Clarinet
Ronnie Boykins - Bass
Clifford Jarvis - Drums
Tommy Hunter - Percussion, Reverb
Ensemble vocals

Recorded entirely at the Choreographer's Workshop, New York (the Arkestra's rehearsal space) in 1963.

Notes

Sun Ra albums
1963 albums
El Saturn Records albums
Evidence Music albums